The 1917 New York State election was held on November 6, 1917, to elect the Attorney General and two judges of the New York Court of Appeals, as well as all members of the New York State Assembly.

History
In 1917, there were only three officers to be elected statewide: 
the Attorney General, to fill the vacancy caused by the resignation of Egburt E. Woodbury. On April 25, 1917, First Deputy Attorney General Merton E. Lewis was elected by the New York State Legislature to fill the unexpired term until the end of the year.
a judge of the Court of Appeals, to fill the vacancy caused by the resignation of Samuel Seabury who had run for Governor of New York in 1916. Democrat Benjamin N. Cardozo was appointed to fill the vacancy temporarily.
a judge of the Court of Appeals, to fill the vacancy caused by the election of Frank H. Hiscock as Chief Judge. Republican Chester B. McLaughlin had been appointed to fill the vacancy temporarily.

The primaries were held on September 19. All nominees were unopposed.

Result
The whole Republican ticket was elected.

The incumbents Lewis, Cardozo and McLaughlin were elected to succeed themselves.

Notes

Sources
Candidates in primaries: CANDIDATES IN FIELD FOR CITY OFFICES in NYT on September 9, 1917
Result for Attorney General in The Public (Vol. 21; 1918; pg. 25)
Court of Appeals totals from New York Red Book 1918

See also
New York state elections

1917
1917 New York (state) elections